In architecture, a quadrangle (or colloquially, a quad) is a space or a courtyard, usually rectangular (square or oblong) in plan, the sides of which are entirely or mainly occupied by parts of a large building (or several smaller buildings). The word is probably most closely associated with college or university campus architecture, but quadrangles are also found in other buildings such as palaces. Most quadrangles are open-air, though a few have been roofed over (often with glass), to provide additional space for social meeting areas or coffee shops for students.

The word quadrangle was originally synonymous with quadrilateral, but this usage is now relatively uncommon.

Some modern quadrangles resemble cloister gardens of medieval monasteries, called garths, which were usually square or rectangular, enclosed by covered arcades or cloisters. However, it is clear from the oldest examples (such as Mob Quad) which are plain and unadorned with arcades, that the medieval colleges at Oxford and Cambridge were creating practical accommodation for college members.  Grander quadrangles that look like cloisters came later, once the idea of a college was well established and benefactors or founders wished to create more monumental buildings. Although architectonically analogous, for historical reasons quads in the colleges of the University of Cambridge are always referred to as courts (such as the Trinity Great Court).

In North America, Thomas Jefferson's design for the University of Virginia centered the housing and academic buildings in a Palladian form around three sides of the Lawn, a huge grassy expanse.  Later, some American college and university planners imitated the Jeffersonian plan, the Oxbridge idea, Beaux-Arts forms, and other models. All five barracks at The Citadel (military college) feature quadrangles with red-and-white squares (the colors of the South Carolina battle flag), which are used for formations by the Corps of Cadets.

Quadrangles are also found in traditional Kerala houses (Naalukettu) and is known as the Nadumittam ("Middle Space").

Notable quadrangles

Woodburn Circle, West Virginia University
Blue Boar Quadrangle, Christ Church, Oxford
Francis Quadrangle, University of Missouri
Memorial Quadrangle, Yale University
Mob Quad, Merton College, Oxford is one of the oldest quads in existence.
Peckwater Quadrangle, Christ Church, Oxford
Killian Court, Massachusetts Institute of Technology
The Quad, Harvard University
Harvard Yard, Harvard University
Queen's Lawn, Imperial College London
The Green, Dartmouth College
King's College Quad, University of Aberdeen
The Quadrangle, Springfield, Massachusetts
Radcliffe Quadrangle, University College, Oxford
Schenley Quadrangle, University of Pittsburgh
Bascom Hill, University of Wisconsin–Madison
Tom Quad, Christ Church, Oxford University
University of Alabama Quad
The Quad, University College London
Founder's Building, Royal Holloway College, London
The Diag, University of Michigan
Sunken Garden, College of William & Mary
The Lawn, University of Virginia
McKeldin Mall, University of Maryland
Old College, Edinburgh
New College, Edinburgh
Holyrood Quad, Moray House, Edinburgh
Dahlgren Quadrangle, Georgetown University
Old Campus, Yale University
Main Quad, Stanford University
Law Quadrangle, University of Michigan
Liberal Arts Quadrangle, University of Washington
West Chester State College Quadrangle Historic District, West Chester University
The Quadrangle, University of Pennsylvania
El Cuadrángulo, University of Puerto Rico, Río Piedras
Whitworth Hall Quadrangle University of Manchester
College Quadrangle, S. Thomas' College, Mount Lavinia

See also

 
 
Haveli, a form of classical architecture from South Asia & Persia, which incorporates a quad for cooling ventilation in the hot climate, and the private enjoyment of the open sky by residents, in a very modest culture

Notes

Architectural elements
Quadrangle (architecture)
University and college buildings
Campuses